Cyprinus longipectoralis is a species of ray-finned fish in the genus Cyprinus. It is endemic to Lake Erhai in Dali, Yunnan.

Footnotes 
 

Cyprinus
Endemic fauna of Yunnan
Freshwater fish of China
Fish described in 1977